The House of the Seven Flies is a 1952 thriller novel by the British writer Victor Canning. The plot revolves around a quarter of a million pounds worth of diamonds stolen from an Amsterdam bank, and the death of the man who ex-British Army officer Edward Furse rents out his boat.

Film adaptation
In 1959 it was adapted into the film The House of the Seven Hawks directed by Richard Thorpe and starring Robert Taylor, Nicole Maurey and Linda Christian.

References

Bibliography
 Goble, Alan. The Complete Index to Literary Sources in Film. Walter de Gruyter, 1999.
 Reilly, John M. Twentieth Century Crime & Mystery Writers. Springer, 2015.

1952 British novels
British thriller novels
British mystery novels
British novels adapted into films
Novels by Victor Canning
Hodder & Stoughton books